This is a list of all lighthouses in the U.S. state of New Jersey as identified by the United States Coast Guard.

References

New Jersey
 
New Jersey transportation-related lists
Lighthouses